Bagh-e Gol Gol (also Romanized as Bāgh-e Gol Gol and Bāgh-i-Gulgul; also known as Gol Gol) is a village in Malavi Rural District, in the Central District of Pol-e Dokhtar County, Lorestan Province, Iran. At the 2006 census, its population was 181, in 42 families.

References 

Towns and villages in Pol-e Dokhtar County